Initial dropping is a sound change whereby the first consonants of words are dropped. Additionally, stress may shift from the first to the second syllable, and the first vowel may be shortened, reduced, or dropped, which can mean the loss of the entire first syllable of a word. These changes have occurred independently in several Australian Aboriginal language groups.

Initial dropping may affect all initial consonants, or only some or one of them. It may affect all words that start with those consonants, or sporadically affect some words and not others. In some languages, it seems to have only affected interjections, and words commonly used as vocatives such as pronouns and kin terms. Like all sound changes, it may affect an entire language or just some dialects, and may affect multiple adjacent languages or dialects.

Motivation
Initial dropping is caused by the nature of stress in Australian languages: although stress is usually on the first syllable, the pitch peak of stress occurs late in the syllable, so that stress applies to the vowel and the following consonant, but not the preceding consonant.

Secondary effects

Cluster simplification
The loss of the initial vowel can result in a difficult consonant cluster. Some languages avoid this by disallowing initial dropping if the result is a difficult cluster. In Mbabaram for example, initial dropping doesn't occur if it results in a cluster other than nasal + stop.

Other languages allow initial dropping, dropping additional consonants if needed to simplify the cluster. For example, in Ngkoth:

Phonemicization
It's not unusual for the second consonant or vowel of a word to have an allophone conditioned by what the first consonant or vowel is. When this conditioning element is lost in initial dropping, these allophones become phonemes.

New vowels

Prestopped nasals
Unlike many other languages, where nasalization tends to begin early so that vowels preceding a nasal are nasalized, in Australian languages nasalization tends to begin late, so that nasals may be preceded by a short stop.

When initial consonants were dropped and initial vowels shortened, the occurrence of the prestopped nasals was no longer predictable: Olgolo had innovated a series of prestopped nasal phonemes.

List of initial-dropping languages
For details about the extent of initial dropping in a particular language, see that language's article.
Adjnjamathanha
Arabana
Arrernte
Baagandji
Bidjara (Gunggari and Yanjdjibara dialects)
Dharambal (Wapabara dialect)
Kalkatungu
Kaytetj
Maljangapa
Mbabaram
Muruwarri
Nganjaywana
Nhanta
Ogh-Undjan
Oykangand/Olgolo
Many Paman languages
Umbindhamu
Uradhi
Yaygirr
Yugambal
Western Desert Language (some dialects)

See also
Aphesis

References

Australian Aboriginal languages
Sound changes